Bago may refer to:

Places

Myanmar
 Bago, Myanmar, a city and the capital of the Bago Region
 Bago District, a district of the Bago Region
 Bago Region an administrative region
 Bago River, a river
 Bago Yoma or Pegu Range, a mountain range

Philippines
 Bago, Negros Occidental, a city
 Bago, a barangay (administrative division) in the municipality Asturias, Cebu
 Bago, a barangay (administrative division) in the municipality Bato, Leyte
 Bago, a supreme deity of the Isnag people; Bago is the spirit of the forest

Other places

 Bago, Albania, a village in Tirana County, Albania
 Bågø, an island of Denmark

People
 Datu Bago (1770–1850), Philippine ruler
 Đuro Bago (born 1961), Croatian football manager
 Mislav Bago (1973-2022), Croatian journalist
 Mohammed Umar Bago (born 1974), Nigerian politician
 Umaru Bago Tafida (born 1954), Nigerian traditional ruler
 Zoltán Bagó (born 1975), Hungarian politician
 José Riquelme y López-Bago (1880–1972), Spanish soldier

Other uses
 Bago (horse), a thoroughbred race horse
 Bago language, a Gur language of Togo
 Bago Palace, in Bago, Philippines
 Mount Bago, a mountain in California